Lago Rosselot National Reserve is a nature reserve located immediately north of Queulat National Park and east of the Carretera Austral, in Aysén del General Carlos Ibáñez del Campo Region, Chile. It is named after Rosselot Lake. It consists of fishing and other water activities.

Protected areas of Aysén Region
National reserves of Chile
Valdivian temperate rainforest